Micro Mobility Systems Ltd, known as Micro, is a Swiss company that produces urban vehicles such as kickscooters and the Microlino, a small electric car which was first presented at the Geneva Motor Show in 2016. In the United States, Micro's products are sold under the brand "Micro Kickboard" for trademark reasons. The company holds several patents for its products.

History

Early history 
Wim Ouboter, born in 1960, invented the kickscooter out of laziness. He stated that the distance from his apartment to his favorite restaurant was too far to travel by foot and yet too close to use a bicycle. He then invented a two-wheeled scooter for those kinds of distances that could easily be folded and placed in a backpack. He pitched his idea to Smart and they were willing to put one Scooter in every single car. Ouboter then tried to find a manufacturer for his innovation, but soon realized that Europe was too expensive. In Taiwan, he convinced the owner of a factory to produce the Scooter; as Smart considered his idea to be good, this helped to convince the factory owner. Just before the production could start, Smart failed the moose test and so the project was put on hold until Smart could resolve the problem.

Formation of Micro Mobility Systems 
While waiting for Smart to resolve the problem, Ouboter had another idea for a three-wheeled scooter, called the Kickboard. He teamed up with K2 and presented his idea at the International Sports Fair (ISPO) in Munich in 1998 very successfully. With the earned money he founded Micro Mobility Systems in 1999 and started producing the two-wheeled Scooter, which was an even bigger success. Because of the excessive demand, he allowed his partner in Taiwan to distribute the Scooter in the United States with the name Razor for a commission. After having sold about one million Scooters in 2000, the sales decreased rapidly in 2001.

Later history 
In the subsequent years, the company continued to invent new products designed for urban mobility, such as the Mini Micro for children, the Scooter Luggage and the electric eMicro One. In addition, Micro has partnered with other brands; these include Peugeot, Suitsupply and Vibram.

The company has also developed the Micro Xtreme for freestyle sports, and works closely with professional athletes like Benjamin Friant. After the huge success in 2000 and the rapid downfall in 2001, Micro has grown organically with a gross revenue in 2014 of 60 Million Swiss Francs. With the development of the company, manufacturing capacities shifted to RazorUSA in California. In 2015, Wim Ouboter was nominated as Entrepreneur of the Year by Ernst and Young.

In July 2019, BMW unveiled two new scooters made in collaboration with Micro Mobility Systems.

Products

Microlino 

The Microlino, legally designated as a light quadricycle with a battery-powered electric motor, was first presented in 2016 at the Geneva Car Show; it is based on the design of the Isetta, a 1950s bubble car which was sold over 160,000 times. It can be charged from a domestic power outlet. The car was expected to be on the market in 2019 with an estimated price of 12,000 Euro, with initial sales limited to Germany and Switzerland. In July 2018, the firm announced that the Microlino had just passed the final tests for EU homologation.

Microletta 

The Microletta is an electric three-wheeler also designed for urban mobility purposes. Currently, the vehicle is still in its planning stages and production has not begun. The three-wheel design is intended to increase the security of the vehicle by enhancing the grip on the front axle, which reduces the braking distance and allows for better stability when cornering. The semi-locking system of the tilting mechanism prevents the vehicle from tilting over when standing and makes a foldable stand unnecessary. The Microletta will be equipped with two exchangeable batteries to enable charging at home.

References

External links 

 Micro Mobility Systems
 Bruch, H. et al. 2003. Micro Mobility Systems. Realizing the Scooter Dream. Case Study, University of St. Gallen, St. Gallen. 2003
 culture.bicycle.birdybike.general: Folding Scooter Story - msg#00015 - OSDir 2000

Kick scooters
Manufacturing companies of Switzerland
Companies based in the canton of Zürich